The Durant Downtown Historic District (DDHD) in Durant, Bryan County, Oklahoma is a  historic district which was listed on the National Register of Historic Places in 2007. It is roughly bounded by 4th Ave., Lost St., Evergreen St. and 1st Ave.

Although construction of Durant's downtown began in the early 1870s, there are no buildings remaining from the very early days. Most of those were hastily built of wood. At least two major fires consumed these downtown buildings. Hence, the Period of Significance for this district is listed as 1901–1957.

It includes work by architects Layton, Hicks & Forsyth.  It included 48 contributing buildings, five contributing structures, and a contributing site, as well as 46 non-contributing buildings and two non-contributing structures.

It includes the J.L. Wilson Building, which is separately listed on the National Register.  No buildings from Durant's founding era, the 1870s, survive.

References

Historic districts on the National Register of Historic Places in Oklahoma
Victorian architecture in Oklahoma
Bryan County, Oklahoma